A statement of case is any of a number of formal documents used in the courts of England and Wales. The Claim Form, Particulars of Claim, Defence and Reply are all statements of case.

See also 
 Civil procedure

References

External links
Part 2 of the Civil Procedure Rules
Part 16 of the Civil Procedure Rules: Statements of Case

English law
Legal documents
English civil law
Statements (law)